Duane Boutté (born March 5, 1966) is an American actor, director, and composer known in film for his portrayal of "Bostonia" in Nigel Finch's Stonewall (1995), and as young "Bruce Nugent" in Rodney Evans' Brother to Brother (2004).  Boutté was in the original Broadway company of Parade, and played "Enoch Snow, Jr." in the 1994 TONY Award-winning revival of Carousel.  His television acting credits date from the 1980s and include episodes of What's Happening Now, A Year in the Life, Sex and the City, and the made-for-television movie The Drug Knot, directed by Happy Days star, Anson Williams.

Early life 
Duane Boutté was born and raised in Fresno, California where his mother (Velda Neal Boutte) taught piano.  Boutté's father, Alfred Boutte, is an Air Force veteran and was regional administrator for California's Employment Development Department.  Boutté's parents were active in community programs, particularly those advancing opportunities for Fresno's black citizens, and are honored in Fresno's African American History Museum.  Duane Boutté is the youngest of the couple's seven children.  Though coming to California from east Texas, Boutté's paternal family has its Creole roots in Louisiana. Boutté began taking piano lessons from his mother when he was a toddler, and started composing music at age 4 that his mother would then transcribe.

In 1979, Boutté's parents took him to Roger Rocka's Music Hall in Fresno to see Anything Goes performed by Good Company Players (GCP).  The musical was preceded by a 15-minute pre-show of song and dance by the troupe's "Junior Company."  Boutté auditioned and was accepted into Junior Company later that year.  Boutté, then 13, would perform six shows each week for the next three years, taking just two weeks off each year for family vacation.  He calls GCP the place where he learned "important...life lessons [like] commitment, responsibility, showing up on time ready, really ready, to work."  In GCP's Junior Company, Boutté worked alongside youngsters who would later become his Broadway colleagues (Audra McDonald, Heidi Blickenstaff, Sharon Leal, Andrea Chamberlain, and Sarah Uriarte Berry). Boutté also performed in plays and musicals with the senior company, mostly under the direction of company founder, Dan Pessano, and gained his first television experience in Junior Company's local Saturday morning variety shows, and holiday specials.

Career 
Duane Boutté's early career was managed by Summer of '42 actress Jennifer O'Neill.  In these years ('86-'88), Boutté filmed episodes of What's Happening Now, A Year in the Life and a made-for-TV movie directed by Anson Williams, and starring Dermot Mulroney.  Boutte completed his B.A. in theatre at UCLA, and earned an M.F.A. in acting under Tony Church at the National Theatre Conservatory in Denver before moving to New York in 1991. That year, Boutté toured the U.S. with Jeffrey Wright (actor), Rainn Wilson and other young actors in The Acting Company's A Midsummer Night's Dream. In 1994, he played "Enoch Snow, Jr." in Lincoln Center's TONY Award-winning revival of Carousel, and was one of Michael Hayden's "Billy Bigelow" understudies.  Boutté returned to Broadway in 1999 in Parade. He has performed numerous roles in classical and contemporary plays Off-Broadway and at leading regional theatres throughout the country.  In 2001, Boutté played "Orestes" in the Oresteia trilogy directed by Tony Taccone and Stephen Wadsworth, inaugurating Berkeley Repertory Theatre's new RODA Theatre.  Among his favorite roles performed, Boutté names "Mercutio" at Oregon Shakespeare Festival, and opportunities to premiere works by playwrights like Terrence McNally, Eric Overmyer, Charles Randolph-Wright, and Robert O'Hara.  Of note among his premieres are Kirsten Childs' Off-Broadway musical The Bubbly Black Girl Sheds Her Chameleon Skin (Playwrights Horizons), and Brian Freeman's play Civil Sex in which Boutté played civil rights activist Bayard Rustin (Berkeley Repertory Theatre).  In New York, Boutté has been listed among Vineyard Theatre's esteemed "Community of Artists."

Boutté stars in two films that have become landmarks in gay cinema.  The first of these, Stonewall (1995), was directed by Nigel Finch (The Lost Language of Cranes).  In the film, Boutté plays "Bostonia," a fictional 'mother' of the Stonewall Inn, whose imagined, first punch incites this film's version of the 1969 Stonewall riots.  Interview magazine profiled Boutté for his performance in the role, stating "a Stonewall star is born."  He was the first of the film's actors to come out as gay in an interview with 4-Front magazine that year.  Boutté later played "Bruce Nugent, young" in Rodney Evans' 2004 film Brother to Brother.  The film, also starring Anthony Mackie and Roger Robinson, presents circa 1920's Bruce Nugent as an unapologetic homosexual accepted, and embraced by celebrated Harlem Renaissance figures like Langston Hughes, and Zora Neale Hurston.

Boutté has directed plays and musicals in regional theatres and universities, and has collaborated as composer on new musicals including Lyin' Up a Breeze (presented by Good Company Players in 2002), and Caravaggio Chiaroscuro (performed at LaMama Etc. in 2007).  He has taught acting at Illinois State University), National Theatre Institute, Ramapo College, and directed work at Stella Adler Studio of Acting in New York.

Feature films

Television

Web series

Broadway

Off-Broadway

Regional Stage

Stage Direction

Musical Compositions and Librettos

References 

1966 births
Living people